Polyany (Swedish: Nykyrka) is a settlement in Vyborgsky District of Leningrad Oblast, Russia, on the Karelian Isthmus. Before the Winter War and Continuation War it was the administrative center of the Uusikirkko municipality of the Viipuri province of Finland.

The Finnish names mean "New Church (Church Lake)" and the Swedish name also means "New Church". Mikael Agricola died there on return from the negotiations for the Treaty of Novgorod (1557).

References

External links
History of Polyany 

Rural localities in Leningrad Oblast
Karelian Isthmus